The nylon riots were a series of disturbances at American stores created by a nylon stocking shortage.

Background
Nylon was first introduced by DuPont around 1939 and was in extremely high demand in the United States, with up to 4 million pairs of stockings bought in one day. During World War II, nylon was used extensively for parachutes and other war materials, such as airplane cords and ropes and the supply of nylon consumer goods was curtailed.

The riots occurred between August 1945 and March 1946, when the War Production Board announced that the creation of Du Pont's nylon would shift its manufacturing from wartime material to nylon stockings, at the same time launching a promotional campaign. In one of the worst disturbances, in Pittsburgh, 40,000 women queued up for 13,000 pairs of stockings, leading to fights breaking out. It took several months before Du Pont was able to ramp up production to meet demand, but until they did many women went without nylon stockings for months.

Wartime "stocking panic" 
During World War II, Japan stopped using supplies made out of silk, and so the United States had difficulty importing silk from Japan. Eventually, the U.S was unable to import any silk. So, Du Pont thought of an idea to convince the army that nylon is a much more effective material than silk. Du Pont was able to convince the army, and nylon fabric became increasingly popular because of its elasticity and shrink-proof, moth-proof material.

Nylon stockings became increasingly popular on the black market, and sold for up to $20 per pair. Women who could not get their hands on nylons resorted to lotions, creams, stick cakes and painting seam lines down their legs to give the illusion of nylons. Because nylon stockings were so widely sought-after, they also became the target of crime. In Louisiana, one household was robbed of 18 pairs of nylons. Similarly, robbery was ruled out as the motive of a murder in Chicago because the nylons were untouched.

George Marion, Jr. and Fats Waller's song "When the Nylons Bloom Again" described this situation in poetic terms:

End of the war and beginning of riots
In August 1945, eight days after Japan's surrender, DuPont announced that it would resume producing stockings and newspaper headlines cheered "Peace, It's Here! Nylons on Sale!" DuPont's announcement indicated that nylons would be available in September and the motto "Nylons by Christmas" was sung everywhere. DuPont originally forecast that it would be able to produce 360 million pairs per year. The shortage remained as DuPont under-delivered on that estimate, and caused mad rushes once stock was made available.

The first riot occurred in September when a small post-war shipment of stockings went on limited sale around the country. In November, 30,000 women reportedly lined up in New York; 40,000 women in Pittsburgh queued up for a mere 13,000 pairs.  The shortage persisted into 1946 but by March, Du Pont was finally able to ramp up production and began churning out 30 million pairs of stockings a month. Widespread availability of the stockings ended the period of 'nylon riots'.

Accusations
During the shortage, many people began to suspect that Du Pont was deliberately delaying production and the shortage was a result of artificial scarcity. DuPont's factories were actually operating at full capacity but nonetheless, public discontent remained high. Reporters suggested the company was being greedy and unpatriotic for maintaining exclusive patent and production rights to a substance in such popular demand. In 1945, an ad appeared in Knit Goods Weekly that called on readers and other retailers to write to their congressmen in protest.

In light of the public scandal, DuPont attempted to publicly shame 'selfish housewives' hoarding stock, which only brought more hostility towards DuPont. In 1951, after the riots had long subsided, DuPont was threatened with an antitrust suit. To avoid a long trial, they then agreed to share nylon licensing with the Chemstrand Corporation, followed by more licensees.

References

Books
 Meikle, Jeffrey L. (1995). "American Plastic: A Cultural History". New Brunswick: Rutgers University Press.
 Peterson, Amy T. ed., Valerie Hewitt, Heather Vaughan, Ann T. Kellogg, and Lynn W. Payne (2008). "The Greenwood Encyclopedia of Clothing Through American History: 1900 to the Present". Westport, Connecticut: Greenwood Press.
 Handley, Susannah (2000). "Nylon: The Story of a Fashion Revolution". Baltimore: Johns Hopkins University Press.
 Hounshell, David A. and Smith, John Kenly, JR (1988). Science and Corporate Strategy: Du Pont R and D, 1902–1980. Cambridge and New York: Cambridge University Press.
 Ndiaye, Pap A. (trans. 2007). Nylon and Bombs: DuPont and the March of Modern America. Baltimore: Johns Hopkins University Press.
 Chandler, Alfred D. (1969). Strategy and Structure: Chapters in the History of the American Industrial Enterprise.

Clothing industry
Clothing controversies
Hosiery
1940s fashion
United States home front during World War II
Riots and civil disorder in Pittsburgh
DuPont